Stoian is a Romanian surname derived from the Bulgarian Stoyan. Notable people with the name include:

Surname:
Adrian Stoian (born 1991), Romanian footballer
Daniel Stoian (born 1967), Romanian sprint canoer
Florin Stoian (born 1971), Romanian singer
Ion Stoian (born 1927), Romanian communist politician
Monica Stoian (born 1982), Romanian javelin thrower
Nicu Stoian (born 1957), Romanian volleyball player

Given name:
Stoian Mladenov (born 1975), Bulgarian footballer

See also 
 Stoenești (disambiguation)

References

Romanian-language surnames